Kyrgyzfilm is a Kyrgyz film studio in Bishkek, founded in 1941.

References

Cinema of Kyrgyzstan
Film production companies of the Soviet Union